"Coming Back for You" is a song recorded by American country music artist Keith Harling.  It was released in August 1998 as the second single from the album Write It in Stone.  The song reached #39 on the Billboard Hot Country Singles & Tracks chart.  The song was written by John Rich, Tom Shapiro and Chris Waters

Chart performance

References

1998 singles
1998 songs
Keith Harling songs
Songs written by John Rich
Songs written by Tom Shapiro
Songs written by Chris Waters
MCA Nashville Records singles